Jean-Félix Krautheimer (1874–1943) was governor of French Cochinchina from 1929 to 1934, subordinate to the then Governor-general . In 1930, he was involved in suppression of the Red Phú Riềng rubber plantation strikes.

References

Governors of Cochinchina
1874 births
1943 deaths
French people in colonial Vietnam